G.I. Honeymoon is a 1945 film directed by Phil Karlson. It stars Gale Storm and Peter Cookson.  Both play a couple who encounter problems as the husband wants to leave the army, but can't. It was nominated for an Academy Award in 1946 for its music.

Plot

Cast
Gale Storm as Ann Gordon
Peter Cookson as Lt. Robert 'Bob' Gordon 
Arline Judge as Flo LaVerne
Frank Jenks as Horace P. 'Blubber' Malloy
Jerome Cowan as Ace Renaldo

Production
Karlson did not like his first film as director for Monogram, calling it "probably the worst picture ever made." However, before it was released "they had given me another story that I flipped over. Oh, I knew this was surefire. So I got into production as fast as I could with the second picture and the second picture was a tremendous hit."

References

External links

1945 films
Films directed by Phil Karlson
Monogram Pictures films
American comedy films
1945 comedy films
American black-and-white films
1940s American films